Truro Township may refer to the following townships in the United States:

 Truro Township, Knox County, Illinois
 Truro Township, Franklin County, Ohio